Peter Bacho is a writer and teacher best known for his book Cebu which won the American Book Award. His book is defined as Filipino American literature because of its explorations in themes such as neocolonialism and Filipino-American identity.

Early life and education
Bacho was raised in Seattle. His father was a field worker. He graduated in 1974.

Career
Bacho also won the Washington Governor's Writers Award for Dark Blue Suit a collection of stories. Many of Bacho's books deal with the Filipino experience in the United States. He considers himself an "old Filipino writer".
Bacho teaches in the Liberal Studies Program at The Evergreen State College, Tacoma Campus.  He is also a lecturer in the Interdisciplinary Arts and Sciences program at the University of Washington Tacoma.

Bibliography
 Cebu (novel, 1991)
 Dark Blue Suit (short stories, 1996)
 Boxing in Black and White (nonfiction, 1999)
 Nelson's Run (novel, 2002)
 Entrys (novel, 2005)
 Leaving Yesler (young adult novel, 2010)

References

External links
 Peter Bacho Writes For The Same Reason He Fights – To Keep A Connection To His Past by Alex Tizon, The Seattle Times, March 1, 1998.
 Fil-Am novelist Peter Bacho captures experiences of war vets, immigrants. Benjamin Pimentel, San Francisco Chronicle podcast, April 10, 2007.

Living people
American writers of Filipino descent
American Book Award winners
Year of birth missing (living people)